Metabutoxycaine, marketed under the trade name Primacaine, is a local anesthetic. It is used in dentistry.

Patent:

References

Local anesthetics
Salicylate esters
Phenol ethers
Anilines
Diethylamino compounds